Kotohira Jinsha v. McGrath, Attorney General,. (90 F. Supp. 892) was a District court case allowing Shinto Shrines to reopen following World War II.

Background
Kotohira Jinsha Shrine was established in 1920.

December 7, 1941, the Empire of Japan attacked Pearl Harbor; thereafter practice of Shinto was banned by martial law; throughout the war clergy are deported to Japan or transferred to the U.S. mainland.

October 24, 1944, martial law was lifted in Hawaii.

September 2, 1945, Japan surrenders and World War II is over.

December 15, 1945, Shinto Directive abolishes State Shinto, Japan’s state religion.

April 6, 1946, without a clergy, the remaining ministry closes Kotohira Jinsha

Case
December 31, 1947, with declining tensions towards Japanese tradition, Shintos reopen Kotohira Jinsha despite the absence of a clergy.

June 1, 1948, federal officers raided the shrine under the Trading with the Enemy Act the seize the Kotohira Jinsha property and making arrests.

March 4, 1949, the Federal Government announces the sale of the seized Kotohira Jinsha property.

April 4, 1949, Kotohira Jinsha reacted by hiring law firm, Robertson, Castle & Anthony.

March 31, 1949, Kotohira Jinsha files lawsuit against the Attorney General’s office (held by J. Howard McGrath) for misusing Section 9 of the Trading with the Enemy Act against a civilian organization and not under the influence of the Japanese government.

March 27, 1950, The trial started and ended on May 17, 1950.

May 18, 1950, Judge J. Frank McLaughlin ruled in favor of the plaintiffs, Kotohira Jinsha.

Judge 
J. Frank McLaughlin

Plaintiffs
Robertson, Castle & Anthony
Joseph G. Anthony
Frank D. Padgett

Defendants
Attorney General’s office
Ray J. O'Brien
Leon R. Gross
Howard K. Hoddick

Conclusion
Judge McLaughlin found the Attorney General’s office in violation of the First Amendment rights of plaintiffs in the United States Constitution with reference to Robert H. Jackson in American Communications Association v. Douds.

Judge J. Frank McLaughlin found the Attorney General’s office had no basis on which to exercise the Trading with the Enemy Act, moreover since 1945 Japan had abolished state religion under Douglas MacArthur and by judicial order return seized property to Kotohira Jinsha.

Results
Kotohira Jinsha Shrine reopened almost immediately after the case that year.
After relocating a second time in 1962 to make way for the H1 Freeway (the first time in 1931) to its current location.

The successful case demonstrated the possibility for other Japanese-based organizations perceived as being wronged by the United States to go to court.

In 2010 the Ground Zero mosque controversy over Park51 near the World Trade Center site, in comparison between the Attack on Pearl Harbor and September 11 attacks, renewed interest Kotohira in Jinsha v. McGrath arose as a counterpart for Park51.

References
The Shinto Shrine Near Pearl Harbor (2010) by Bob Jones, MidWeek
Kotohira Jinsha v. McGrath, 90 F. Supp. 892 - Dist. Court, D. Hawaii 1950 (1950)
History of the Shrine Hawaii Kotohira Jinsha - Hawaii Dazaifu Tenmangu

1950 in United States case law
United States district court cases
United States free exercise of religion case law
1950 in religion
Shinto in the United States
Legal history of Hawaii
1950 in Hawaii